Bismuth hydroxide is non-fully characterised chemical compound of bismuth. It is produced as white flakes when alkali is added to a solution of a bismuth salt and is usually described as bismuth oxide hydrate or bismuth hydrate.

Uses
Bismuth hydrate is a component used in milk of bismuth which is used in gastrointestinal disorders as a protective agent. Aqueous ammonia reacts with bismuth(III) ions to precipitate white bismuth hydroxide.

It is used as an absorbent, and in the hydrolysis of ribonucleic acid.  It is also used in the isolation of plutonium from irradiated uranium/

References

Bismuth compounds